Mario Tremblay, better known under his moniker MC Mario, is a Canadian song producer, disc jockey, and a former Virgin radio host from Montreal, Quebec.<ref>IMO Records. "MC Mario Biography", IMO Records' Retrieved on March 14, 2011.</ref>

Biography
Born circa 1970, Mario studied in sound tracking/acoustic equipment at the UQAM. Upon graduating, he would go on to start his radio career in late 1980s with CKMF-FM (as a co-host) in Montreal, prior to switching to CJFM in 1991 which is now Virgin Radio Montreal. And as of now, he has stopped broadcasting at Virgin Radio Montreal as of November 19, 2021. He currently hosts “The Party Weekend” on The Beat 92.5 starting at 5 every weekend.

In 2010 he has taken up co-ownership of the prestigious Club 1234 (now known as Le cinQ) where he's also shared the stage with DJs like Carl Cox, Bob Sinclar, Axwell, and others. From 1995 and up until 2021 he has hosted #1 Canadian Dance Party "The House Party" every weekend on Virgin Radio Montreal as well. 

Since 1993, he has been releasing mixtape compilations of various EDM artists at least 3 times a year. To date, MC Mario has sold more than 3.5 million albums in Canada alone, making him the 28th biggest selling Canadian artist of all-time. His album Summer Anthems 2011'' was certified gold by Music Canada on December 21, 2011.

Additionally, since 2003, he is also known for producing his own tracks (alongside promotional young remixers). Some of his latest single productions include "Rockstar" (2012), "Lose My Mind" ft. Stephane Moraille (2013), "Anti Gravity" ft. Kirsten Collins (2014), "Love is Who We Are" (2015), "Dreamers" ft. Vanessa Piunno (2016), and "Tears of Heaven" (2018).

He has also been known to release remixes of tracks by several local and worldwide artists, such as "Thousand Miles" by Stevyn (2017), "U Gave Me" by Noah Ayrton (2018) and others. With his single "Breakaway" featuring BE1 (2019), MC Mario joined Canadian music label Funktasy. His most recent releases on the international label in 2020 were "No Xplanation" and "Biggie's Soul" a collaboration with Hoss as part of MC Mario & Hoss.

MC Mario was also the official DJ of the Montreal Canadiens and was with the team when they won the Stanley Cup in 1993.

In November 2021, MC Mario and Virgin Radio Montreal parted ways after 30 years.

Releases

References

External links
 

1970 births
Living people
Canadian radio personalities
Canadian television personalities
Canadian DJs
Canadian dance musicians
Musicians from Montreal
Fontana North artists